Euspilotus conformis is a species of clown beetle in the family Histeridae. It is found in North America, with sightings mostly occurring in New Jersey and Florida, although it has been seen as far west as just east of the Rocky Mountains.

References

Further reading

 

Histeridae
Articles created by Qbugbot
Beetles described in 1845